GHR  may refer to:

 Ghera language
 Growth hormone receptor
 Guard Hussar Regiment (Denmark), of the Royal Danish Army
 Gustav Heinrich Ralph von Koenigswald (1902–1982), German paleontologist and geologist 
 Greatest Hits Radio Network, a number of radio stations in The UK.